Poédogo, Bazèga may refer to:

Poédogo, Doulougou
Poédogo, Kombissiri